Marius Petru Ungureanu (born 17 May 1994) is a biathlete who was the flag bearer for Romania at the 2018 Winter Olympics Parade of Nations.

References 

Olympic biathletes of Romania
1994 births
Living people
Biathletes at the 2018 Winter Olympics
Romanian male biathletes
Biathletes at the 2012 Winter Youth Olympics